Captain Leonard LaRue (January 14, 1914 – October 14, 2001), later known as "Brother Marinus", was the skipper of the SS Meredith Victory, a United States Merchant Marine cargo freighter that was involved in the largest humanitarian rescue operation by a single ship in human history. Under LaRue's leadership, the ship evacuated over 14,000 refugees to safety during the Korean War.

Early career 
Leonard LaRue attended the Pennsylvania Nautical School, served aboard the Schoolship Annapolis, and graduated in 1934.

Rescue operation
Three days before Christmas in 1950, Captain LaRue's SS Meredith Victory was delivering military supplies to the besieged port of Hungnam in northeast Korea. Nearly 100,000 Korean refugees had gathered, hoping to board ships evacuating United Nations Command soldiers, arms, and supplies to safety in the southern port of Pusan.

With the SS Meredith Victory as one of the last remaining ships, over 14,000 refugees remained. LaRue made the decision to unload nearly all of the arms and supplies on the ship in order to board as many refugees as possible.

Only hours away from advancing Chinese and North Korean communist forces, LaRue ordered the ship to be converted to hold the refugees and was able to evacuate the refugees out of Hungnam.

On December 23, the Meredith Victory sailed south with no mine detection equipment, no doctor, no interpreter, no lighting in the holds, no heat, and no sanitation facilities. The ship's only gun was the pistol in Captain LaRue's pocket. The ship arrived in Pusan on Christmas Eve before heading to its final destination, Geoje Island.

After the war
After the war, LaRue entered St. Paul's Abbey in Newton, New Jersey to live out his days as a Benedictine monk. He committed his days to the tradition of ora et labora—prayer and work—and was given the religious name "Brother Marinus". On March 25, 2019, Bishop Arthur Serratelli, bishop of the Roman Catholic Diocese of Paterson opened the canonization cause for Captain LaRue, known as Brother Marinus, OSB.

See also 
 Hungnam evacuation

References

1914 births
2001 deaths
American sailors
American Benedictines
Sea captains
People from Newton, New Jersey
Catholics from New Jersey
American Servants of God
21st-century venerated Christians